Adrine Monagi (born 8 June 1995) is a Papua New Guinean Sprinter and Heptathlete. Monagi competed in athletics during the 2015 Pacific Games where she won gold in the women's heptathlon event.

Personal Bests

All information taken from All-Athletics profile.

References

External links
 
 
 
 

1995 births
Living people
Papua New Guinean female sprinters
Commonwealth Games competitors for Papua New Guinea
Athletes (track and field) at the 2014 Commonwealth Games
Athletes (track and field) at the 2018 Commonwealth Games